Ivanovych or Ivanovich is a Ukrainian patronymic surname meaning "Son of Ivan" (-ych -ov Ivan). The patryrnomic form is created with the suffix -ovych, the Ukrainian equivalent of "-son" or "-sson" ('s son), attached to Ivan (lit. John). Ivan is the Ukrainian form of "John", so Ivanovych is equivalent to 'Johnson' or 'Johnsson'. Thus Ivanovych can be translated as "Son of John" or "John's Son". This is one of several ways that "Ivan" can be turned into a surname, with at least thirty-six reported variants including Ivanenko, Ivaniuk, and Ivanchuk.

See also
 
 Search for "Ivanovych"
 Ivanov (surname), meaning "of Ivan" or "Ivan's"
 Ivanovitch, a Russian surname
 Ivanović, a Serbo-Croatian surname
 Ivanovski, a Macedonian surname

References